Governor Moore may refer to:

A. Harry Moore (1879–1952), 39th Governor of New Jersey
Andrew B. Moore (1807–1873), 16th Governor of Alabama
Arch A. Moore Jr. (1923–2015), 28th and 30th Governor of West Virginia
Charles Brainard Taylor Moore (1853–1923), Naval Governor of American Samoa from 1905 to 1908
Charles C. Moore (1866–1958), 13th Governor of Idaho
Charles Moore, 1st Marquess of Drogheda (1730–1822), Governor of County Meath in 1759 and Governor of Kinsale and Charles Fort in 1765
Dan K. Moore (1906–1986), 66th Governor of North Carolina
Gabriel Moore (1785–1845), 5th Governor of Alabama
Henry Monck-Mason Moore (1887–1964), 1st Governor-General of Ceylon
Sir Henry Moore, 1st Baronet (1713–1769), Acting Governor of Jamaica, and royal Governor of the Province of New York from 1765 to 1769
James Moore (governor) (1650–1706), 13th Colonial Governor of South Carolina
James Moore II (1667–1723), Governor of the Province of South Carolina from 1719 to 1721
John Isaac Moore (1856–1937), Acting Governor of Arkansas in 1907
Marshall F. Moore (1829–1870), 7th Governor of Washington Territory
Miles Conway Moore (1845–1919), 14th Governor of Washington Territory
Samuel B. Moore (1789–1846), 6th Governor of Alabama
Thomas Overton Moore (1804–1876), 16th Governor of Louisiana
 CSS Governor Moore - American Civil War gunboat named after Thomas Overton Moore
Wes Moore (born 1978), 63rd Governor of Maryland
William Moore (statesman) (1735–1793), 4th President of Pennsylvania

See also
Richard More (1879–1936), Governor of Khartoum Province from 1913 to 1920